Pratap Adsad is an Indian politician. In 2019 he was elected to the Maharashtra Legislative Assembly as Bharatiya Janata Party member for Dhamangaon Railway Assembly constituency.

Political career
He joined Bharatiya Janata Yuva Morcha. He is the youngest elected president - Dhamangaon Railway NagarParishad.

Positions held

Within BJP

Vice President, BJYM Maharashtra State Unit
Secretary, BJYM Maharashtra State Unit

Legislative

Member, Maharashtra Legislative Assembly - Since 2019

References

Living people
1979 births
Maharashtra MLAs 2019–2024